Motorcycling greetings can include several gestures made between motorcyclists on the road. Titles for this greeting include "Biker wave", "Motorcyclist wave", "Motorcycle wave" or just "The Wave."  The greeting made can include a number of gestures including a nod, a pointed finger, palm-out V sign, or an actual raised-hand wave.

Warnings
Motorcyclists may use specialized hand signals to both greet and warn oncoming riders:
Circling raised finger — police ahead
Patting helmet — check your lights or police ahead

Regional differences
The use of specific gestures may be culturally or regionally dependent. Some observers have commented that waving is common amongst riders in North America but uncommon in some European countries, like Germany. 
French riders will stick their foot out when overtaking another motorcycle, and while lane splitting when a car facilitates it. In Britain, vehicles drive on the left hand side of the road, and so bikers will most commonly give each other a nod, rather than releasing the throttle to wave, or waving with the clutch hand which would likely be difficult to see.

Notes

References

Motorcycling subculture
Gestures